Neospastis ichnaea is a moth in the family Xyloryctidae. It was described by Edward Meyrick in 1914. It is found in India.

The forewings are whitish fuscous, on the dorsal two-thirds more or less suffused with light fuscous and sprinkled irregularly with dark fuscous. There is a more or less developed fine dark fuscous streak along the fold towards the base and oblique dark fuscous spots on the costa at one-fourth, the middle, and three-fourths. The stigmata are small and dark fuscous, the plical obliquely beyond the first discal. There is also a series of dark fuscous dots around the apex and termen. The hindwings are pale fuscous.

The larvae feed on Symplocos spicata. Feeding between spun leaves, or a broken portion spun on the surface of a whole leaf. The larvae are green, with a brown head, black collar and with a lateral (spiracular) series of black spots, also with black supraspiracular spots on 3, 4, and several of the posterior segments.

References

Neospastis
Moths described in 1914